Sekampung River is a river in Lampung province, southern Sumatra, Indonesia, about 130 km northwest of the capital Jakarta.

Geography
The river flows in the southeast area of Sumatra with predominantly tropical rainforest climate (designated as Af in the Köppen-Geiger climate classification). The annual average temperature in the area is 26 °C. The warmest month is October, when the average temperature is around 28 °C, and the coldest is March, at 25 °C. The average annual rainfall is 2932 mm. The wettest month is January, with an average of 433 mm rainfall, and the driest is September, with 63 mm rainfall.

See also
List of rivers of Indonesia
List of rivers of Sumatra

References

Rivers of Lampung
Rivers of Indonesia